Alan Kennedy may refer to:

Alan Kennedy (born 1954) is an English former footballer
Alan Kennedy (hurler) (born 1987), Irish hurler
Alan Kennedy (psychologist), British psychologist

See also
Allan Kennedy (born 1958), Canadian-born American football player